Kaliakair is an upazila (sub-district) of the Gazipur District in central Bangladesh, part of the Dhaka Division.

Geography
It has 45565 households and total area 314.14 km2. It is bounded by mirzapur and sakhipur upazilas on the north, savar and dhamrai upazilas on the south, gazipur sadar and sreepur upazilas on the east, Mirzapur upazila on the west.

Water bodies Main rivers: turag, bangshi, Salda; Boali, Hawla, Ujan and Markaj beels and Goala and Betjuri canals are notable.
<RAFI>

Demographics
As of the 1991 Bangladesh census, Kaliakair has a population of 232915. Males constitute 91.21% of the population, and females 85.79%. This Upazila's eighteen up population is 126799. Kaliakair has an average literacy rate of 90.3% (7+ years), and the national average of 90.4% literate.

Population Total '267003; male 138240, female 128763; Muslim 231672, Hindu 34306, Buddhist 910, Christian 30 and others 85. Indigenous communities such as Koch and Badey belong to this upazila.

Economy
There are 1000 + Garments factory in Kaliakair. Many Garemnts Worker living here.

Administration
Kaliakair Thana was formed in 1923 and it was turned into an upazila on 2 July 1983.

Kaliakair Upazila is divided into Kaliakair Municipality and nine union parishads: Atabaha, Boali, Chapair, Dhaljora, Fulbari, Madhayapara, Mouchak, Sreefaltali, and Sutrapur. The union parishads are subdivided into 183 mauzas and 264 villages.

Kaliakair Municipality is subdivided into 9 wards and 18 mahallas.

See also
 Upazilas of Bangladesh
 Districts of Bangladesh
 Divisions of Bangladesh

References

Upazilas of Gazipur District